Therese Sander (born November 22, 1948) is a Missouri farmer and a former  Republican member of the Missouri House of Representatives.

She was born in Columbia, Missouri, and graduated magna cum laude from the University of Missouri-St. Louis.  She is married and has four adult daughters: Tamara Copple, Kathleen Basi, Andrea Williamson, and Cecelia Cannon.

She is a member of St. Pius X Catholic Church, Randolph County Farm Bureau, Missouri Cattlemen's Association, Missouri Pork Producers, Moberly Area Chamber of Commerce, Missouri State Teachers Association, and Missouri Right to Life.  She was appointed to the Missouri Rural Economic Development Council and to the Council of State Governments' Agriculture and Rural Policy Task Force for 2003–2004 and again for 2005–2006.

She was first elected to the Missouri House of Representatives in 2002, winning reelection in 2004, 2006. and 2008. By Missouri law she was term limited from running again in 2010.

References

Official Manual, State of Missouri, 2005-2006. Jefferson City, MO: Secretary of State.
Representative data page

1948 births
Living people
Politicians from Columbia, Missouri
University of Missouri–St. Louis alumni
People from Moberly, Missouri
Farmers from Missouri
Republican Party members of the Missouri House of Representatives
Women state legislators in Missouri
American women farmers
21st-century American politicians
21st-century American women politicians